BV, B.V., Bv, bV, or bv may refer to:

In arts and entertainment
 Backing vocal, in music, a vocal harmony with the lead vocalist provided by one or more backing vocalists
 Busoni-Verzeichnis, a catalogue of compositions by Ferruccio Busoni

Companies and organizations
 Beaulieu Vineyard, a Napa Valley winery
 Besloten vennootschap, a type of Dutch private limited liability company. Dutch for "private company", similar to the American concept of a limited liability company.
 Bicycle Victoria, an Australian bicycle advocacy organisation
 Black & Veatch, a U.S.-based engineering, consulting and construction company
 Blue Panorama Airlines (IATA airline designator)
 Bottega Veneta, a manufacturer of luxury leather goods
 Bureau Veritas, a testing, inspection, and certification company (stock symbol BV)

Science and medicine

Biology and medicine
 Bacterial vaginosis, the most common cause of vaginal infection
 Belch Vocalizations, the most common form of intra-group communication among the mountain gorilla
 Biological value, a measure of the proportion of absorbed protein from a food which becomes incorporated into the proteins of the organism's body
 Binocular vision, vision in which both eyes are used together
 Blood vessel, part of the circulatory system that transports blood throughout the body
 Biovar, a rank below species often written as bv.

Mathematics and computing
 Batalin–Vilkovisky formalism, a concept in mathematical physics to construct gauge theories
 Bounded variation, a concept in mathematical analysis
 Bounding volume, in computer graphics and computational geometry, a closed volume that completely contains the union of objects in the set

Other uses in science and technology
 Bavarian B V, early German 2-4-0 type of locomotive of the Royal Bavarian State Railways
 Bed volume, the volume of material in a vessel (e.g. of a catalyst in a vessel, or stationary phase in column chromatography)
 Boiling vessel, equipment provided to an armoured vehicle for heating food or water (chiefly British)
 Breakdown voltage, the minimum voltage that causes an insulator to become electrically conductive
 Lohner B.V, a variant of the Lohner B.II military reconnaissance aircraft

Language 
 Voiced labiodental affricate (⟨b̪͡v⟩, ⟨b̪͜v⟩, or ⟨b̪v⟩), a type of consonant sound

Other uses
 Blessed Virgin Mary (Roman Catholic), Mary, mother of Jesus, as venerated in the Roman Catholic Church
 Book value, in accounting, the value of an asset according to its balance sheet account balance
 Bouvet Island, an uninhabited South Atlantic sub-Antarctic volcanic island
 .bv, the inactive ccTLD for Bouvet Island
 Bronze Star Medal with Valor
 Bysshe Vanolis, pen-name of Scottish poet James Thomson

See also
B5 (disambiguation)
Buena Vista (disambiguation)